Nikolai Pavlovich Barabashov (March 30, 1894 – April 29, 1971) was a Ukrainian astronomer.

Barabashov was born in Kharkiv, Kharkbv Governorate, Russian Empire. He graduated from Kharkiv University, Ukraine, in 1919; served as Director, Kharkiv Observatory, 1930; Professor, Kharkiv University, 1934; Rector, Kharkiv University, 1943-1946. He became a member of the Ukrainian SSR Academy of Sciences in 1948.

He was a co-author of the ground breaking publication of the first pictures of the far side of the Moon in 1961, called Atlas of the Other Side of the Moon. Barabashov, crater on Mars, was named in his honor in 1973. 2883 Barabashov, a minor planet discovered in 1978 by Soviet astronomer Nikolai Chernykh, is named after him.

Honours and awards
 Hero of Socialist Labour
 Four Orders of Lenin
 Order of the Red Banner of Labour

References

Sources 

 Astronomical Institute of Kharkiv National University

1894 births
1971 deaths
Scientists from Kharkiv
People from Kharkovsky Uyezd
Communist Party of the Soviet Union members
Fourth convocation members of the Supreme Soviet of the Soviet Union
Fifth convocation members of the Supreme Soviet of the Soviet Union
Soviet astronomers
National University of Kharkiv alumni
Academic staff of Kharkiv Observatory
Heroes of Socialist Labour
Recipients of the Order of Lenin
Recipients of the Order of the Red Banner of Labour